A synovial joint, also known as diarthrosis, joins bones or cartilage with a fibrous joint capsule that is continuous with the periosteum of the joined bones, constitutes the outer boundary of a synovial cavity, and surrounds the bones' articulating surfaces. This joint unites long bones and permits free bone movement and greater mobility. The synovial cavity/joint is filled with synovial fluid. The joint capsule is made up of an outer layer of fibrous membrane, which keeps the bones together structurally, and an inner layer, the synovial membrane, which seals in the synovial fluid.

They are the most common and most movable type of joint in the body of a mammal. As with most other joints, synovial joints achieve movement at the point of contact of the articulating bones.

Structure 
Synovial joints contain the following structures:
 Synovial cavity: all diarthroses have the characteristic space between the bones that is filled with synovial fluid
 Joint capsule: the fibrous capsule, continuous with the periosteum of articulating bones, surrounds the diarthrosis and unites the articulating bones; the joint capsule consists of two layers - (1) the outer fibrous membrane that may contain ligaments and (2) the inner synovial membrane that secretes the lubricating, shock absorbing, and joint-nourishing synovial fluid; the joint capsule is highly innervated, but without blood and lymph vessels, and receives nutrition from the surrounding blood supply via either diffusion (a slow process) or by convection, a far more efficient process achieved through exercise.
 Articular cartilage: the bones of a synovial joint are covered by this layer of hyaline cartilage that lines the epiphyses of joint end of bone with a smooth, slippery surface that does not bind them together; articular cartilage functions to absorb shock and reduce friction during movement.

Many, but not all, synovial joints also contain additional structures:
 Articular discs or menisci - the fibrocartilage pads between opposing surfaces in a joint
 Articular fat pads - adipose tissue pads that protect the articular cartilage, as seen in the infrapatellar fat pad in the knee
 Tendons - cords of dense regular connective tissue composed of parallel bundles of collagen fibers
 Accessory ligaments (extracapsular and intracapsular) - the fibers of some fibrous membranes are arranged in parallel bundles of dense regular connective tissue that are highly adapted for resisting strains to prevent extreme movements that may damage the articulation
 Bursae - saclike structures that are situated strategically to alleviate friction in some joints (shoulder and knee) that are filled with fluid that is similar to synovial fluid

The bone surrounding the joint on the proximal side is sometimes called the plafond, especially in the talocrural joint. A damage to this occurs in a Gosselin fracture.

Blood supply
The blood supply of a synovial joint is derived from the arteries sharing in the anastomosis around the joint.

Types 
There are seven types of synovial joints. Some are relatively immobile, but are more stable. Others have multiple degrees of freedom, but at the expense of greater risk of injury. In ascending order of mobility, they are:

Function

The movements possible with synovial joints are:
 abduction: movement away from the mid-line of the body
 adduction: movement toward the mid-line of the body
 extension: straightening limbs at a joint
 flexion: bending the limbs at a joint
 rotation: a circular movement around a fixed point

Clinical significance
The joint space equals the distance between the involved bones of the joint. A joint space narrowing is a sign of either (or both) osteoarthritis and inflammatory degeneration. The normal joint space is at least 2 mm in the hip (at the superior acetabulum), at least 3 mm in the knee, and 4–5 mm in the shoulder joint. For the temporomandibular joint, a joint space of between 1.5 and 4 mm is regarded as normal. Joint space narrowing is therefore a component of several radiographic classifications of osteoarthritis.

In rheumatoid arthritis, the clinical manifestations are primarily synovial inflammation and joint damage. The fibroblast-like synoviocytes, highly specialized mesenchymal cells found in the synovial membrane, have an active and prominent role in the pathogenic processes in the rheumatic joints. Therapies that target these cells are emerging as promising therapeutic tools, raising hope for future applications in rheumatoid arthritis.

References 
 

Joints